Thomas Walter Mitchell (11 November 1906 – 4 February 1984) was an Australian politician, author and sportsman.

Mitchell was born at the family property "Towong Hill", near Corryong, Victoria and was educated at Cambridge University from 1925 to 1930 before returning to Australia, and Towong Hill.

A keen skier, Mitchell founded the Australian National Ski Federation in 1932, captained the Australian skiing team and won gold medals in competitions against England and New Zealand. He was an Australian champion in the downhill and long-time member of the Australian Ski Club. He and his wife Elyne Mitchell (daughter of General Sir Harry Chauvel) were the first people to ski the western slopes of the Main Range of the Snowy Mountains, including the demanding runs of "Little Austria".

Mitchell joined the Second Australian Imperial Force in 1940 and was a captain in the 2/22 Battalion and Headquarters 8th Division. He was captured by the Japanese in 1942 and was interned in the infamous Changi POW camp until 1945, being forced to work on the Burma Railway by his captors.  While at Changi, he also helped found the Changi ski club. He later built a chapel, in memory of comrades lost during the war, on his property.

In 1947 he and Elyne, together with Ossie Rixon, set off in two four-wheel-drive vehicles to become the first people to cross the Australian Alps in a motor vehicle. "One", a Willys army jeep, sits in Corryong to this day.

He served as the Country Party member for Benambra in the Victorian Legislative Assembly from 1947 to 1976, as Attorney-General from June 1950 to 27 October 1952 and again from 31 October to December 1952.  He was also Solicitor-General from June 1950 to December 1951, the last politician to hold the office, replaced by a non-political barrister, Henry Winneke. This was the start of a fundamental shift of the role of Solicitors-General in Australia.

He contributed to the official history of the Second World War and wrote several volumes on skiing and local history.

Mitchell died in Melbourne in 1984.

References

 

1906 births
1984 deaths
People from Corryong
Alumni of the University of Cambridge
Members of the Victorian Legislative Assembly
World War II prisoners of war held by Japan
Attorneys-General of Victoria
Solicitors-General of Victoria
Australian Army personnel of World War II
Australian prisoners of war
Australian male alpine skiers
Burma Railway prisoners
Australian Army officers
Sportsmen from Victoria (Australia)
Military personnel from Victoria (Australia)